Bellona may refer to:

Places
Bellona, Campania, a comune in the Province of Caserta, Italy
Bellona Reef, a reef in New Caledonia
Bellona Island, an island in Rennell and Bellona Province, Solomon Islands

Ships
HMS Bellona (1760), a 74-gun third rate
Bellona (1782 ship), a merchant vessel for the British East India Company
HMS Bellona (1806), a 28-gun sixth rate, formerly the French privateer Bellone
HMS Bellona (1909), a Boadicea-class scout cruiser
HMS Bellona (63), a modified Dido-class light cruiser launched in 1942
 Bellona, a French ship captured in 1759 by Samuel Hood, 1st Viscount Hood
 Bellona, a Swedish class of frigates and a ship designed by Fredrik Henrik af Chapman in the late 18th century

Other uses
 Bellona (goddess), a Roman goddess of war
 28 Bellona, an asteroid
 Bellona Foundation, a Norwegian environmental organisation
 Bellona Publishing House, a Polish publishing house
 Bellona, a fictional city in Samuel R. Delany's novel Dhalgren
Bellona Arsenal, a 19th-century United States Army and Confederate arsenal in Virginia, U.S. 
Bellona Foundry, a 19th-century United States Army and Confederate foundry in Virginia, U.S.

See also
B'Elanna, a character in Star Trek: Voyager
HMS Bellona, a name held by eight ships of the Royal Navy